Michael Turner (born 1934) is a British illustrator who specialises in motoring and aviation paintings. He is regarded as one of the early examples of such type and is one of the most highly regarded of all. Turner counts racing drivers, teams, sponsors, pilots, motor and aircraft manufacturers, R.A.F. (Royal Air Force) and Army messes, museums and private collections as his client lists and has hosted a number of solo shows all over the world, plus other specialist shows.

Biography
Turner was born and raised within the suburbs of Harrow, Middlesex. During the Second World War, he became interested in aviation and aeroplanes of the Royal Air Force and drew aircraft in his school exercise books which infuriated his teachers.  After the war, Turner developed an interest in motoring and motorsport when during his family holiday to the Isle of Man in 1947, they attended the British Empire Trophy Race.

After leaving school, Turner attended an art college, followed by national service with the Royal Electrical and Mechanical Engineers for two years.  His first job after national service was with a London advertising studio, and he turned freelance in 1957. Turner's artworks were shown regularly on the wall of the renowned Steering Wheel Club in London and many of these illustrations appeared on magazine and book covers.

In the 1960s, Turner started up his own company, 'Studio 88', to publish his aviation and motor racing prints, as well as his annual set of Christmas Cards that became popular with enthusiasts. He was commissioned by organisers to create official posters for notable motorsport events such as 24 hours of Le Mans, 12 hours of Sebring, a number of Formula One races and many others that took place in notable circuits such as Nürburgring. He was notable in the United States for his poster works for races that took places in Watkins Glen between 1969 and 1980 and also created posters for its United States Grand Prix East races.

With a need to capture the genuine nature of being in an event, Turner tends to travel to as many motorsport and aviation events as he could where he commonly sketches at events he attends for reference reasons.

Turner was also involved with the Can-Am series and had close ties with the McLaren team, which he became friends with its drivers, Denny Hulme and Bruce McLaren. He was responsible for the design of the bodywork of the race winning McLaren M1B and designed the team logo as well as designing the colour scheme for its first Formula One car of the 1966 season. That colour scheme was short-lived as prior to the Monaco Grand Prix, the car's livery had to be changed when it was chosen by the producers of the film Grand Prix to  be the lead car of the 'Yamura' team, driven by its lead character, Pete Aron (played by James Garner), the colour scheme was changed to team's white and blue, resembling that of Honda.

He is a founder member of The Guild of Aviation Artists, of which he has been Chairman on two occasions and is currently President, and is also an Honorary Fellow of the Guild of Motoring Artists.

Turner has been involved with the Red Arrows, and has flown with them in the past. He counts racing drivers, teams, sponsors, pilots, motor and aircraft manufacturers, R.A.F. and Army messes, museums and private collections in his client list and has hosted a number of solo shows all over the world, plus other specialist shows. His artwork has also appeared on the packaging of Airfix models. Turner has had, to this date, six books of his works published.

Personal life
Turner has been married to Helen since 1960. They have two daughters, Alison and Suzanne.  His son, Graham, is also an artist, and they continue to visit several Grands Prix each year. Turner is licensed to fly a private aircraft, and flies his privately owned Chipmunk aircraft in his spare time.

Michael and his son have held exhibitions of their artworks at Halton House in 2005 and 2006.

Published works
La Vie D’un Mécanicien (illustrations, with Melville Wallace, 1979)
Luftwaffe Aircraft (illustrations, with Francis Mason, 1981)
La Vie Des Pilotes De Course de 1919 á 1939 (1983)
Formula One: The Cars and the Drivers (with Nigel Roebuck, 1983)
La Vie Des Pilotes De Courses (illustrations, with Pierre Dumont, 1983)
Royal Air Force: The Aircraft in Service since 1918 (illustrations, 1986)
The Aviation Art of Michael Turner (1994)
Grand Prix De Monaco through the eyes of Michael Turner, (text by David Waldron, 1995)
The Motorsport Art of Michael Turner (1996)
Drawing and Painting Racing Cars (1999)

References

External links

Formula One journalists and reporters
20th-century English painters
English male painters
21st-century English painters
English illustrators
1934 births
Living people
People from Harrow, London
20th-century English male artists
21st-century English male artists